This is a complete list of animated films released theatrically starring Felix the Cat.

Short films

Silent films

Paramount Pictures (1919–1921)
The first 25 Felix cartoons were distributed to theaters by Paramount Pictures. The character was named "Master Tom" until The Adventures of Felix.

Margaret J. Winkler (1922–1925)
64 cartoons

General Electric (ca. 1925 commercial for Mazda Lamps)

Educational Pictures (1925–1928)
78 cartoons.

Sound films

Copley Pictures (1929–1930)
Copley Pictures was the first distributor to issue Felix cartoons with sound. There were 12 originally with sound, and 16 reissues, for a total of 28 cartoons.

Sound reissues
A number of silent Felix cartoons were also re-issued by Copley at this time, with their intertitles removed and sound added. Newer simple titles were also inserted in most reissues, which removed signs of Educational Pictures copyrights. Jacques Kopfstein was hired by Pat Sullivan to add sound to the film. This was done via the "goat gland" system of adding sound. All Felix shorts that were re-issued in sound have Post-synchronized soundtracks. (The soundtrack was made to match the already-existing film.) As a result, the synchronization is not perfect, and there is occasionally an audible delay between the action and the sound effect.

New releases
Copley also distributed 12 cartoons originally with sound.

Van Beuren Studios (1936)

This short revival of Felix (as a more childlike character, similar to his later 1959 incarnation) was produced by Van Beuren Studios and distributed to theaters by RKO Radio Pictures. All of these cartoons were the first to be produced in three-strip Technicolor.

Television

Feature length films
More than five decades following the last theatrical shorts, a Felix feature film was produced. Although originally intended to be released theatrically, it was released as a direct-to-video feature instead.

In Felix the Cat Saves Christmas, Felix along with his magic bag of tricks must stop the Professor and Rock Bottom from ruining Christmas. The Professor plans to use his diabolical snow-making machine to create the biggest blizzard the world has ever seen. If his scheme works, Christmas will be canceled for sure. Felix heroically sets off for the North Pole to help Santa - but Felix will need every trick in his magic bag.

References

Sources

External links 

 Bold King Cole at the TCM Movie Database

Film series introduced in 1919
Felix the Cat
 
Lists of American animated films